The 1963 edition of the Campeonato Carioca kicked off on June 30, 1963 and ended on December 15, 1963. It was organized by FCF (Federação Carioca de Futebol, or Carioca Football Federation). Thirteen teams participated. Flamengo won the title for the 14th time. no teams were relegated.

System
The tournament would be disputed in a double round-robin format, with the team with the most points winning the title.

Championship

Final 
Flamengo defeated Fluminense in the final. A world record for soccer, 194 603 spectators, were present in Maracanã stadium.

References

Campeonato Carioca seasons
Carioca